British actress Vivien Leigh (1913–1967) was born in Darjeeling, India; her family returned to England when she was six years old. In addition to her British schooling, she was also educated in  France, Italy and Germany, and became multilingual. Classically trained at the Royal Academy of Dramatic Art, her film debut was in an uncredited role in the 1935 comedy Things Are Looking Up.
 
While studying Shakespearean drama at The Old Vic, she met Laurence Olivier, who would become her most frequent artistic collaborator. Even though her film roles brought her global name recognition and acclaim, the bulk of her work was in theatrical productions, frequently with Olivier as her director and/or co-star. Many of their productions on the British stage were based on the works of William Shakespeare. In 1943, as part of the Old Vic Spring Party, they toured North Africa for three months entertaining British troops.  In 1961, they were part of The Old Vic Tour of Australia, New Zealand, Mexico and South America.

She appeared in 19 theatrically released films, twice winning the Academy Award for Best Actress, both times for her dramatic depictions of women from the American South. Her first Oscar was in 1939, for her performance in Gone with the Wind as Margaret Mitchell's protagonist Scarlett O'Hara.
She won the role after a two-year search for the ideal actress had eliminated many of Hollywood's top talents. Her second Oscar was in 1951, for A Streetcar Named Desire. Playwright Tennessee Williams saw her on the London stage, and after conveying his impressions to co-producer Irene Mayer Selznick, Leigh was signed for the role of Blanche DuBois in the 1949 London production of the play.  After playing the role of DuBois for 326 performances, Leigh was flown to Los Angeles to begin filming the movie version.

Her star was placed on the Hollywood Walk of Fame on February 8, 1960.

Stage

Films

Bibliography

References 

Actress filmographies
British filmographies
Shakespearean actresses
Indian filmographies